The Qishla of Jeddah is a historical edifice in Jeddah, Saudi Arabia, built in 1525 to be a military castle of the Ottoman army. Today, the ruins of the castle lay beneath the Jeddah branch of the ministry of defense.

Qishla (modern Turkish: Kışla) is a Turkish word meaning "barracks".

Notes

Infrastructure completed in 1525
Forts in Saudi Arabia
Buildings and structures in Jeddah
Castles in Saudi Arabia